Ovachlamys is a genus of land snails in the family Helicarionidae.

Species
Species include:

 Ovachlamys fulgens – jumping snail
Ovachlamys fulgida
Ovachlamys kandai
Ovachlamys kotosyonis

References

External links
 Ovachlamys. GBIF.

Helicarionidae